The Anglican Church of the Blessed Virgin Mary in Ashill, Somerset, England was built in the 12th century. It is a Grade II* listed building.

History

The church was built in the 12th and 13th centuries but has been revised several times since.

The parish is part of the Isle Valley benefice within the Diocese of Bath and Wells.

Architecture

The stone buildings has tiled roofs. It consists of a three-bay nave and a single-bay chancel. The two-stage west tower is supported by corner buttresses.

The north and south doorways have decorated arches which may have survived from a previous church on the site before 1100.

Inside the church are a 17th-century pulpit and 15th century octagonal font.

See also  
 List of ecclesiastical parishes in the Diocese of Bath and Wells

References

Grade II* listed buildings in South Somerset
Grade II* listed churches in Somerset